Duchess Park Secondary School is a public high school in Prince George, British Columbia, part of School District 57 Prince George.

History  
Duchess has also been known as Prince George High School and Duchess Park Junior Secondary School. Prior to 1974 its grade structure comprised Grades 8-10; in 1974-75 Grade 11 was added, and in 1975-76 Grade 12 was added. In 2010 the new building was completed and all the students were moved to the new school which was designed by Hughes Condon Marler Architects.

Academics 
Duchess was rated as the top secondary school in Prince George (2004/05)(144th overall in the province) by the 2004/05 Fraser Institute rankings.

Alumni 
 Nilesh Patel - filmmaker
 Daniel Lapp - musician

Athletics 
Duchess Park has consistently placed athletes on provincial teams, national teams and has athletes playing college sports across all levels (USPORTS, CCAA, and NCAA). 

The Condors are 14 time Provincial Champions:

 1980 Boys AAA Basketball Provincial Champions
 1996 Girls AAA Volleyball Provincial Champions
 1996 Girls AA Basketball Provincial Champions
 1997 Girls AAA Volleyball Provincial Champions
 1997 Girls AA Basketball Provincial Champions
 2000 Girls AA Basketball Provincial Champions
 1999 Boys AA Volleyball Provincial Champions
 2001 Girls AAA Volleyball Provincial Champions
 2002 Girls AAA Volleyball Provincial Champions
 2006 Boys AA Basketball Provincial Champions
 2016 Girls AAA Basketball Provincial Champions
 2021 Boys AA Volleyball Provincial Champions
Duchess Park played host to the Girls AAA Volleyball Provincial Championships in 2010.

Duchess Park has teams in eleven sports, including basketball, football, wrestling, volleyball, golf, badminton, soccer, rugby, track & field, cross country and Esports.

Duchess Park has won an astounding 120+ North Central District Zone Championships across nearly every sport in which the school has participated in as well as over 30 City Championships for basketball. The high school is widely considered one of the top athletic schools in British Columbia.

The site was also used as a venue for the 2015 Canada Winter Games.

References

External links
School reports - Ministry of Education

 School Performance

High schools in Prince George, British Columbia
Educational institutions in Canada with year of establishment missing